Charlis José Ortiz García (born 21 July 1986) is a Venezuelan footballer who plays for Metropolitanos.

References

1998 births
Living people
Venezuelan footballers
Venezuelan expatriate footballers
Deportivo Anzoátegui players
Deportivo La Guaira players
Deportivo Táchira F.C. players
A.C.C.D. Mineros de Guayana players
C.D. Huachipato footballers
Venezuelan Primera División players
Chilean Primera División players
Expatriate footballers in Chile
Association football forwards
People from El Tigre